Elaidic acid is a chemical compound with the formula , specifically the fatty acid with structural formula , with the double bond (between carbon atoms 9 and 10) in trans configuration.  It is a colorless oily solid. Its salts and esters are called elaidates. 

Elaidic acid is an unsaturated trans fatty acid, with code C18:1 trans-9.  This compound has attracted attention because it is a major trans fat found in hydrogenated vegetable oils, and trans fats have been implicated in heart disease.

It is the trans isomer of oleic acid.  The name of the elaidinization reaction comes from elaidic acid.

Its name comes from the Ancient Greek word ἔλαιον (elaion), meaning oil.

Occurrence and bioactivity
Elaidic acid occurs naturally in small amounts in caprine and bovine milk (very roughly 0.1% of the fatty acids) and in some meats.

Elaidic acid increases plasma cholesterylester transfer protein (CETP) activity which lowers HDL cholesterol.

See also
 Oleic acid

References

Fatty acids
Alkenoic acids